Rajae Imran  or Raja Imrane ( is  a Moroccan actress and ex- journalist.

Career 

Rajae Imran is Well known for her major role in the TV series Al Mostadaafoun (المستضعفون, The Underdogs) as Aicha with actor Rachid El Ouali, which is her first appearance. She also worked in several Moroccan productions such as Aalach ya waldi ?, Wahda men Bezzaf, Machaf Mara.

Notable Works 

 Al mostadaafoun (The Underdogs) 
 Aalach ya waldi (why my son..?)
 Rommana w Bertal (Rommana And Bertal)
 Herch  
 Wahda men Bezzaf  
 Machaf Mara

References 

Living people
Moroccan television actresses
21st-century Moroccan actresses
Moroccan journalists
Moroccan women journalists
Year of birth missing (living people)
Place of birth missing (living people)